Åke Jensen (1912–1993) was a Swedish stage and film actor and singer. He appeared in a number of operettas and revues.

Selected filmography
 Dear Relatives (1933)
 Pettersson - Sverige (1934)
 The Song to Her (1934)
 Odygdens belöning (1937)
 How to Tame a Real Man (1941)
 A Girl for Me (1943)
 Kärlek och allsång (1944)
 The Old Clock at Ronneberga (1944)
 The Bells of the Old Town (1946)
 Poor Little Sven (1947)
 Private Bom (1948)
 Divorced (1951)
 Blondie, Beef and the Banana (1952)

References

Bibliography
 Jean-Louis Ginibre, John Lithgow & Barbara Cady. Ladies Or Gentlemen: A Pictorial History of Male Cross-dressing in the Movies. Filipacchi Publishing, 2005.
 Steene, Birgitta. Ingmar Bergman: A Reference Guide. Amsterdam University Press, 2005.

External links

1912 births
1993 deaths
Swedish male film actors
Swedish male stage actors
20th-century Swedish male actors
People from Karlstad